The 2013 Radio Disney Music Awards were held on April 27, 2013, at the Nokia Theatre L.A. Live in Los Angeles, California, after a five-year hiatus after 2007.

Production
On March 15, 2013, The 2013 Radio Disney Music Awards was confirmed at Nokia Theatre L.A. Live, in Los Angeles, California. The awards would be held on April 27, at 6:00 pm. Tickets started selling on March 15, on Ticketmaster. The Radio Disney Music Awards contained 11 categories, with 3 to 5 nominees for votes in 4 weeks.

Performers

Presenters
(in order of appearance)
Jessica Sanchez & Jason DeRulo - presented Best Acoustic Performance
Cody Simpson - presented Hero for Change Award to Scooter Braun
Ross Lynch & Maia Mitchell - presented Best Crush Song
Demi Lovato, on screen  - introduced Cher Lloyd
Tatyana Ali & China Anne McClain - presented Best Female Artist
Austin Mahone & Trevor Jackson - presented Best Male Artist
Bella Thorne - presented Melissa and IM5
Melissa Peterman & IM5 - presented Funniest Celebrity Take
Radio-Disney's Jake Whetter & Laura Marano - presented Best Breakup Song
Megan & Liz - introduced Bridgit Mendler
Olivia Holt & Trevor Bayne - presented Best Music Group
Selena Gomez - Presented Heroes For Change To Sponsor Unicef
Fifth Harmony - presented Song of the Year
Leo Howard, Denise Richards, & Lola Sheen - presented Best Music Video
Alli Simpson - introduced her brother
Zendaya & Valentin Chmerkovskiy - presented Breakout Star
Willow Shields - introduced Coco Jones
Coco Jones - introduced Mindless Behavior
Roshon Fegan & Ariana Grande - presented Fiercest Fans
Ryan Seacrest, on screen - introduced Selena Gomez
Debby Ryan - presented Hero for Change Award to Ben Harowiez for his work w/ Free the Children
Caroline Sunshine & Adam Irigoyen - presented Hero for Change Award to Denzell Perry of the Boys and Girls Club

Nominees and winners
On March 15, 2013 the nominations were announced.

Best Female Artist
Selena Gomez
Cher Lloyd
Taylor Swift
Bridgit Mendler

Best Male Artist
Justin Bieber
Cody Simpson
Austin Mahone
Bruno Mars

Song of the Year
"I Knew You Were Trouble" – Taylor Swift
"Beauty and a Beat" – Justin Bieber featuring Nicki Minaj
"Live While We're Young" – One Direction
"Want U Back" – Cher Lloyd

Best Music Group
One Direction
IM5
Mindless Behavior
R5

Breakout Star
Austin Mahone
IM5
Ryan Beatty
Cimorelli
Christina Grimmie

Funniest Celebrity Take
"Sandwich Rap" - Coco Jones
"How To Audition" - Cher Lloyd
"Air Guitar" - Ross Lynch

Best Music Video
"Heard It on the Radio" – Ross Lynch
"Ready or Not" - Bridgit Mendler
"Fashion Is My Kryptonite" – Zendaya and Bella Thorne
"Holla At The DJ" – Coco Jones

Best Breakup Song
"We Are Never Ever Getting Back Together" – Taylor Swift
"Want U Back" – Cher Lloyd
"Payphone" – Maroon 5 featuring Wiz Khalifa
"Wide Awake" – Katy Perry

Best Crush Song
"Had Me @ Hello" – Olivia Holt
"Wish You Were Here" – Cody Simpson featuring Becky G
"Say You're Just a Friend" – Austin Mahone
"Heart Skips a Beat" – Olly Murs

Best Acoustic Performance
"Ready or Not" - Bridgit Mendler
"Say Somethin" - Austin Mahone
"Loud" - R5
"Heart Skips a Beat" – Olly Murs

Fiercest Fans
Directioners – One Direction
Beliebers - Justin Bieber
Mahomies - Austin Mahone
Selenators - Selena Gomez
Simpsonizers - Cody Simpson

Heroes for Change Award
Mary Dawson, a 15-year-old student from Los Angeles, won the Heroes for Change for her charity work and her involvement with PressFriends, a project which teaches children how to write. Misha Ahmad, Denzell Perry, Dara Reyes and Ben Harowitz were the other honorees.

References

External links
Official website
2014 Radio Disney Music Awards

Radio Disney Music Awards
Radio Disney Music Awards
Radio Disney Music Awards
Radio Disney Music Awards
2013 awards in the United States